The Women's time trial of the 2010 Dutch National Time Trial Championships cycling event took place on 23 June 2010 in and around Oudenbosch, Netherlands.

Final classification

Results from uci.ch.

References

External links

Dutch National Time Trial Championships
2010 in women's road cycling